The Springfield Model 1875 was a variant of the Springfield Model 1873 rifle.

History and Design
The Model 1875 officer's rifle was checkered fore and aft of the trapdoor breech and tipped with white metal. It was fitted with a "globe and pinhead" foresight and a "buckhorn" backsight on the barrel. 

The rifle had a trigger which could be set to use as a hair trigger. A wooden cleaning rod was fitted under the barrel, and was referred to as a "ramrod" in the rifle's documentation.

The rifle originally sold for $36.

See also
 Springfield rifle

References

Springfield firearms
Hinged breechblock rifles
Rifles of the United States
Weapons and ammunition introduced in 1875